"Moonshake" is a song by the krautrock band Can, on their 1973 album Future Days. Unusually for this album, known for its ambient, lengthy tracks, the song is short and has a pop structure, and was released as a single.

The band Moonshake takes its name from this song.

References

1973 songs
Psychedelic songs
Can (band) songs